Rubén Carballo (born 25 December 1962) is an Argentine boxer. He competed in the men's flyweight event at the 1984 Summer Olympics.

References

1962 births
Living people
Argentine male boxers
Olympic boxers of Argentina
Boxers at the 1984 Summer Olympics
Boxers from Buenos Aires
Flyweight boxers